is a Japanese bank. It is a subsidiary of Seven & I Holdings Co., Ltd. (parent company of 7-Eleven Japan and Ito Yokado). Conducting its business primarily through the Internet, IY Bank has automatic teller machines in 7-Eleven convenience stores and Ito Yokado general-merchandise stores in Japan, and on April 27, 2005, opened its first branch with live staff. Customers with accounts at certain banks can process transactions at IY terminals at no cost; IY collects a handling fee from customers at other banks.

Seven Bank began accepting foreign-issued ATM and credit cards in June 2007. Cards with Visa, Plus, American Express, Discover, JCB, Diners Club or China UnionPay logos on them are all accepted to withdraw yen from the machines.

In December 2009, Seven Bank discontinued ATM services for MasterCard, Maestro and Cirrus cards. Seven Bank said that from their perspective, a revision of the terms and conditions on the part of MasterCard did not "sustain the economic viability of (Mastercard) services". ATM services for MasterCard, Maestro and Cirrus cardholders were restored in August 2010, but were suspended again in April 2013 for similar reasons.

On March 22, 2011, Seven Bank and Western Union started the Seven Bank International Money Transfer Service as part of their mobile and internet banking services. On July 19, 2011, the service was expanded to Seven Bank ATMs, which has about 16,000 locations nationwide with English and Japanese telephone customer support. On November 7, 2011, localized telephone support in Chinese, Spanish, Portuguese and Tagalog was started in order to assist customers using the service.

References

External links 

 

Seven & I Holdings
Banks established in 2001
Banks of Japan
Financial services companies based in Tokyo